The 2018 New Zealand Warriors season was the 24th season in the club's history. Coached by Stephen Kearney and captained by Roger Tuivasa-Sheck, the Warriors completed the National Rugby League's 2018 Telstra Premiership regular season in the number eight position, qualifying for the finals. They were defeated in the 1st Elimination Final by Penrith and did not progress further.

Milestones

Jersey and sponsors

Fixtures

Pre-season training
Pre-season training began on 1 November, with the exception of 14 players involved in the 2017 Rugby League World Cup.

Pre-season matches
The Warriors and Melbourne will headline a two-day festival in Rotorua that includes a regional nines tournament.

Regular season

Home matches were played at Mount Smart Stadium in Auckland, while one away game was also played in New Zealand, at AMI Stadium in Christchurch.

The Warriors opened their season in Perth against the South Sydney Rabbitohs on 10 March as part of a double header at Perth Stadium. Mount Smart Stadium will hosted a double header on 7 April when the Warriors played the North Queensland Cowboys and the Wests Tigers played the Melbourne Storm.

Ladder

Squad

Staff

Head office staff
Managing Director: Cameron George
General manager – football: Brian Smith
Media and communications manager: Richard Becht
Football operations manager: Dan Floyd
Team manager: Laurie Hale
Head of medical services: John Mayhew
Head of recruitment: Brian Smith
Welfare and education manager: Jerry Seuseu

Coaching staff
NRL head coach: Stephen Kearney
NRL assistant coach: Andrew McFadden
NRL assistant coach: Stacey Jones
Strength and conditioning coach: Alex Corvo
NSW Cup head coach: Tony Iro
Under-20s head coach: Ricky Henry
Under-20s assistant coach: Jerome Ropati

Transfers

References

External links
Warriors 2018 season rugby league project

New Zealand Warriors seasons
New Zealand Warriors season
Warriors season
2018 NRL Women's season